Selami Sahin (born 1948) is a Turkish musician, singer, and songwriter.

Life and career 

Şahin's works have been performed in different languages by artists from European and Middle Eastern countries. He was born to a mother of Egyptian Arab descent settled in Hatay and a Turkish father. He knows not only Turkish but also Arabic as mother tongues. Owing to his mother, he speaks in Arabic of Egyptian accent first. Since Arabic is his mother tongue, he has also participated in joint projects with many famous figures such as Ghada Ragab and Enrico Macias. As a commentator, composer and songwriter, he continued his musical life and later he started art directing and vocal coaching.

In 1980 he founded the music production company Lider Müzik.

In 2011, when he celebrated his 45th year of career, and his works, which were previously covered by many artists, were put with acoustic and new arrangements and in his album Mahzen .

Besides his music career, he has also had an acting career and starred in several feature films. One of the most prominent movies that he starred in was Runaway Mummy (2002), which was co-produced by Turkey and Egypt and released in 22 countries. It was also the first Turkish film to be included at the 6th Hollywood Film Festival, and Şahin's performance received positive reception.

In 2012, he appeared in a commercial for Akbank and performed his song "Sensiz Olmuyor".

Discography

Awards

Filmography

See also 
List of Turkish musicians

References

External links 
Selami Şahin  selamisahin.com.tr.

1948 births
Living people
Turkish male singers
Turkish lyricists
Turkish composers
Turkish people of Egyptian descent